The 2012–13 Colorado Buffaloes men's basketball team represented the University of Colorado in the 2012–13 NCAA Division I men's basketball season. Head coach Tad Boyle was in his third season at Colorado. They were members of the Pac-12 Conference and played their home games at the Coors Events Center. They finished the season 21–12, 10–8 in Pac-12 play to finish in fifth place. They lost in the quarterfinals of the Pac-12 tournament to Arizona. They received an at-large bid to the 2013 NCAA tournament where they lost in the second round to Illinois.

Roster

Source

2012–13 Schedule and results

 
|-
!colspan=9| Regular season

|-
!colspan=9| 2013 Pac-12 men's basketball tournament

|-
!colspan=9|2013 NCAA tournament

References

Colorado
Colorado Buffaloes men's basketball seasons
Colorado
Colorado Buffaloes men's basketball
Colorado Buffaloes men's basketball